A battery swapping (or switching) station allow electric vehicles to exchange a discharged battery pack for a charged one as an alternative to plugging the vehicle into a charging station. Battery swapping is common in electric forklift applications.

Currently, Taiwanese scooter manufacturer Gogoro operates the largest battery swap network for electric mopeds, with nearly 11,000 GoStations in Taiwan, and 250 in China. Chinese luxury carmaker Nio is the only major operator of automobile battery swapping stations for the public. The company has built around 1,000 battery swap stations around China and Europe, and the process takes three minutes from start to finish. Previously, Renault and Tesla attempted to make their vehicles capable of swapping batteries.

History

The concept of an exchangeable battery service was proposed as early as 1896. It was first offered between 1910 and 1924, by Hartford Electric Light Company, through the GeVeCo battery service, serving electric trucks. The vehicle owner purchased the vehicle, without a battery, from General Vehicle Company (GeVeCo), part-owned by General Electric. The power was purchased from Hartford Electric in the form of an exchangeable battery. Both vehicles and batteries were designed to facilitate a fast exchange. The owner paid a variable per-mile charge and a monthly service fee to cover truck maintenance and storage. These vehicles covered more than 6 million miles.

Beginning in 1917, a similar service operated in Chicago for owners of Milburn Electric cars. A rapid battery replacement system was implemented to service 50 electric buses at the 2008 Summer Olympics.

In 1993, Suntera developed a two-seat 3-wheel electric vehicle called the SUNRAY, which came with a battery cartridge that swapped out in minutes at a battery-swap station. In 1995, Suntera added a motor scooter. The company was later renamed Personal Electric Transports(P.E.T.). After 2000 the company developed an electric bus. In 2004, the company's 3-wheel stand-up EV won 1st place at the 5-day long American Tour de Sol electric vehicle race, before closing in 2006.

Some smaller schemes have attempted to popularize battery swapping with individual cities. Zotye Auto built a fleet 15 of M300 EV hatchbacks for a taxi fleet in Hangzhou, China. In 2011, one of these vehicles caught on fire after the battery pack in the trunk caught fire. An investigation later found that battery in question, as well as the connecting electronics in the truck, had become worn out form repeated loading and unloading of charged battery packs. The electric scheme was halted following the incident.

The Better Place network was the first modern attempt at making the battery switching model mainstream. The Renault Fluence Z.E. was the first car enabled to adopt the approach and was offered in several countries, including those where no battery swap stations had been planned.

Better Place launched its first battery-swapping station in Israel, in Kiryat Ekron, near Rehovot in March 2011. The exchange process took five minutes. Subsequent battery swap stations were built in Denmark. Better Place filed for bankruptcy in Israel in May 2013.

In 2012, Tesla started building a proprietary fast-charging Tesla Supercharger network. A year later, in June 2013, Tesla announced its plan to offer battery swapping. Tesla showed that a battery swap with the Model S took just over 90 seconds. The vehicle purchase included one battery pack. After a swap, the owner could later return and receive their battery pack fully charged. A second option would be to keep the swapped battery and receive/pay the difference in value between the original and the replacement. Pricing was not announced. In 2015 the company abandoned the idea for lack of customer interest.

Other battery swapping service providers include Gogoro, Delta Electronics, BattSwap,, Voltia, and Swap & Go. By early 2022, Nio had built more than 850 swap stations in China, up from 131 in 2020. A station can cost $772,000 in China. A 90 kWh battery is charged at 60 kW and can be swapped in 6 minutes. China operates cement trucks where the heavy battery is swapped. A battery swap system with a 2MWh battery in each 20-foot shipping container powering a converted canal barge began operating in the Netherlands in 2021.

Trial Run of EV Battery Swapping In Singapore 
Singapore started experimenting with EV battery swapping from 2022. In 2022, the country's land transport authority gave Gogoro the go-ahead to conduct a trial run of deploying swappable EV batteries - specifically for food delivery service providers. In 2023, Mo Batteries partnered with SingPost to provide battery replacement support for two electric bikes used by SingPost.

Gallery

Criticism

Battery swapping solutions were criticized as proprietary. By creating a monopoly regarding the ownership of the batteries and the patent-protected technologies the companies split up the market and decrease the chances of wider usage of battery swapping. BMW termed battery swapping as a waste of time.

References

Charging stations
Electric vehicles